Maintenon (foaled 1903 in France) was a French Thoroughbred racehorse.  He was bred by Gaston Dreyfus  at his Haras du Perray in Les Bréviaires, Yvelines. Maintenon was out of the mare, Marcia, and sired by Le Sagittaire, a multiple winner of what today are Group One races.

Purchased as a yearling for twenty-three thousand French francs by American sportsman William Kissam Vanderbilt of the prominent Vanderbilt family of New York City, Maintenon was conditioned for racing by future U.S. Racing Hall of Fame trainer, William Duke. In 1906, Maintenon won ten major races in France, including the French Derby, and another two the following year.

In the 1906 Grand Prix de Paris, Maintenon was beaten by Epsom Derby winner Spearmint and in anticipation of a rematch, Vanderbilt entered the colt in the 1907 Ascot Gold Cup at Ascot Racecourse in England. However, in April 1907 Maintenon suffered a tendon injury and was retired to stud.

He first stood at Haras de Villebon in Villebon-sur-Yvette then at his owner's Haras du Quesnay. Among his offspring the most notable was Brumelli who won the 1917 Grand Prix de Paris and Prix du Jockey Club and who helped Maintenon become that year's Leading sire in France.

Following the death of owner Vanderbilt in 1922, the Haras du Quesnay and Maintenon were acquired by another American, A. Kingsley Macomber. The last foal sired by Maintenon was born in 1926.

Pedigree

References

External links
 Maintenon's pedigree and racing stats

1903 racehorse births
Racehorses bred in France
Racehorses trained in France
French Thoroughbred Classic Race winners
Vanderbilt family
Thoroughbred family 2-a